Mangalorean Chicken Sukka or Kori Sukka/Kori Ajadina(Tulu) is an Indian chicken dish native to Mangalore and Udupi region. The word "Sukka" comes from Hindi "Sukha" which means "Dry", sometimes also called as "Kori Ajadina". However it can be prepared in two variations: dry and semi gravy.

See also
 List of chicken dishes
 Mangalorean cuisine
 Kori rotti

References

Mangalorean cuisine
Indian chicken dishes
Indian curries